Colobothea hirtipes is a species of beetle in the family Cerambycidae. It was described by DeGeer in 1775. It is known from Bolivia, Brazil, Guyana, French Guiana, Suriname, and Peru.

References

hirtipes
Beetles described in 1775
Taxa named by Charles De Geer